Nandgaon Khandeshwar is a city and a municipal council in Amravati district in the state of Maharashtra, India. Nandgaon Khandeshwar is one of the three townships (talukas) in Chandur (Railway) subdivision in Amravati district. The other two are Dhamangaon Railway and Chandur Railway. Khandeshwar Temple is the most famous and oldest place in Nandgaon Khandeshwar and was built by Hemadpantis. In Maha Shivaratri, there is a fair at Khandeshwar Temple, which is a big event for the people of Nandgaon Khandeshwar. This event is celebrated for 7 days by all of Nandgaon.
This is one of the municipalities (nagar panchayats) of Amravati district. It has good connectivity by road and is near Samruddhi Highway and Navnagar.

Khandeshwar Temple

There is one oldest temple of Khandeshwar Bhagawan built by Hemadpantis.

Demographics 
As per Indian government census of 2011, the population was 129,810. Out of these 6661 were males and 63149 were females.

See also
 Khandeshwar

References

Cities and towns in Amravati district
Talukas in Maharashtra